Love ± Zero (pronounced "Love Plus/Minus Zero") is an album by the Japanese band Soul Flower Union.

Track listing

External links

2002 albums